Robyn Jane Malcolm  (born 15 March 1965) is a New Zealand actress, who first gained recognition for her role as nurse Ellen Crozier on the New Zealand soap opera Shortland Street.

She is best known for six seasons of playing Cheryl West, matriarch to a sometimes criminal working-class family in the television series Outrageous Fortune, Kirsty Corella in the Australian television series Rake, Julie Wheeler in Upper Middle Bogan and Marina Baxter in The Code.

Early life and education
Malcolm was born in Ashburton, and attended Ashburton College, and graduated from Toi Whakaari (New Zealand Drama School) with a Diploma in Acting in 1987. She won an International Actors Fellowship at the Globe Theatre in London for 2003.

Career
Malcolm's first long-running television role was nurse Ellen Crozier in soap opera Shortland Street. She appeared on the show for five years and was nominated for Best Actress at the 1998 TV Guide Television Awards. She was nominated again for her lead role in television feature, Clare, based on the cervical cancer experiment at Auckland's National Women's Hospital which resulted in the Cartwright Inquiry.

In 1999, Malcolm was one of the founding members of the New Zealand Actors' Company along with Tim Balme, Katie Wolfe and Simon Bennett. The company produced and toured a number of successful stage productions throughout New Zealand.

In 2005, Malcolm took on the role of Cheryl West, matriarch of the West family, in Outrageous Fortune. Mixing comedy and drama, the show became one of the highest rating and awarded in New Zealand history. Malcolm won NZ television awards for the role including the Qantas TV Awards for Best Actress in 2005 and 2008, TV Guide Best Actress in 2006, 2007, 2008, 2009, 2010 and 2011 and Air NZ Screen Awards Best Actress in 2007

Malcolm won the Woman's Day Readers' Choice Award for Favourite New Zealand Female Personality in 2005, and New Zealand's sexiest woman at the 2007 TV Guide Best on the Box awards.

Malcolm co-starred in 2010 feature film The Hopes and Dreams of Gazza Snell, playing mother to a family obsessed with go-karting and motorsports. She has also had small roles in movies Absent Without Leave directed by John Laing, The Last Tattoo directed by John Reid, Gaylene Preston's Perfect Strangers, and Christine Jeffs' Sylvia. She had a minor role as Morwen in the second film of the Lord of the Rings trilogy.

In the 2019 Queen's Birthday Honours, Malcolm was appointed a Member of the New Zealand Order of Merit, for services to television and theatre.

Filmography

Films

Television

Theatre

Personal life
Malcolm has two sons. Her sister is married to Roger Sutton, the former CEO of the Canterbury Earthquake Recovery Authority.

Activism
Malcolm voiced Green Party of Aotearoa New Zealand advertisements for the New Zealand general election, 2008.

Malcolm has helped spearhead an actors' union campaign to negotiate standard contracts for actors in The Hobbit films. The producers refused, saying that collective bargaining would be considered price-fixing and therefore illegal under New Zealand law. The situation escalated into international calls for an actors' boycott of the films, but the boycott was called off. Several days later, the producers said they were considering moving the films to another country as they could not be guaranteed stability in New Zealand. In response, the ruling National Party made several controversial changes to New Zealand's employment laws, and passed legislation explicitly controlling people working on the Hobbit movies.

References

External links
 
 New Zealand Listener – Cheryl and me
 Biography at Johnson and Laird
 Robyn's profile and ScreenTalk interview August 2009.  Requires Flash video software (53.6 MB).

1965 births
Living people
New Zealand film actresses
New Zealand television actresses
New Zealand soap opera actresses
Toi Whakaari alumni
People from Ashburton, New Zealand
20th-century New Zealand actresses
21st-century New Zealand actresses
People educated at Ashburton College
Members of the New Zealand Order of Merit